Machriyeh (also Romanized as Machrīyeh; also known as Makrīyeh, Mojrīyeh, Mokrīyeh, and Moshīrīeh) is a village in Bostan Rural District, Bostan District, Dasht-e Azadegan County, Khuzestan Province, Iran. At the 2006 census, its population was 87, in 14 families.

References 

Populated places in Dasht-e Azadegan County